Gebran is a well-known given name and family name in Arabic. It is also transliterated as Gibran, Jebran, Jibran, Joubran, Jubran, Goubran and Gubran. It might also appear with an additional "e" at the end, like in Gebrane, Gibrane etc.

Gebran and variants Gibran, Goubran, Gubran, Jebran, Jibran, Joubran and Jubran may refer to:

Gebran
Gebran Araiji (born 1951), Lebanese politician and former president of the Syrian Social Nationalist Party (SSNP)
Gebran Bassil, Lebanese politician and government minister
Gebran Tueni (1957–2005), full name Gebran Ghassan Tueni, Lebanese politician, minister and the former editor and publisher of Lebanese daily paper An Nahar. Victim of assassination.
Gebran Andraos Tueni (died 1948),  Lebanese journalist, founder of Lebanese daily paper An Nahar

Ghibran
Mohamaad Ghibran (born 1980), Indian composer known for his work in Tamil and Telugu films

Gibran
Kahlil Gibran (1883–1931), full name Gibran Khalil Gibran, Lebanese artist, poet, and writer
Kahlil Gibran (sculptor) (1922–2008), full name Kahlil George Gibran, Lebanese American painter and sculptor
Khalil Gibran Muhammad (born 1972), American academic
Gibran Hamdan, American NFL football player
Gibrán Lajud Bojalil (born 1993), Mexican footballer
Gibran Marten (born 1987), Indonesian actor and singer
Gibran Mohammed (born 1983), Trinidadian cricketer
Gibran Rayo (born 2001), American soccer player

Goubran
Yara Goubran, Egyptian film, television and stage actress

Jabron
Jabron Hashmi (1982—2006), British soldier killed in action in Sangin, Afghanistan

Jebran
Nicolas Jebran, Lebanese fashion designer

Jibran
Syed Jibran, Pakistani actor known for his lead role in Hum TV series Meray Khwab Raiza Raiza

Joubran
Salim Joubran (born 1947), Israeli Arab judge on the Supreme Court of Israel
Wissam Joubran (born 1983), Palestinian composer, oudh virtuoso, and master lute maker. Part of Le Trio Joubran
Le Trio Joubran, an oud trio of the brothers Samir, Wissam, and Adnan Joubran, playing traditional Palestinian music

Jubran
Hanna Jubran, Palestinian sculptor
Jabir Jubran Al Fayfi, Saudi Arabian national who was held in extrajudicial detention in Guantánamo Bay detention camp, in Cuba on allegations he trained and fought with Al-Qaeda and the Taliban in Afghanistan in 2001
Sultan Jubran Sultan al-Qahtani (1974–2003) known also as Zubayr Al-Rimi, a militant in al-Qaeda's Saudi wing accused of complicity in the Riyadh compound bombings in 2003.

See also
Institutions named after or in tribute to Gibran Khalil Gibran
Gibran Khalil Gibran Garden, a public garden in the Centre Ville area of Beirut, Lebanon
Gibran Museum, formerly the Monastery of Mar Sarkis, biographical museum in Bsharri, Lebanon, dedicated to the Lebanese artist, writer and philosopher Khalil Gibran
Khalil Gibran International Academy, a public school in Boerum Hill, Brooklyn, New York City
Khalil Gibran School Rabat, Morocco

Others
Gibran (crater), a crater on Mercury
Gowrun, Kerman, a village in Iran, also known as Gebrān, Gabrān and Jowrān

Arabic-language surnames
Arabic given names